Rebecca Eaton  (born November 7, 1947) is an American television producer and film producer best known for introducing American audiences to British costume and countryside dramas as executive producer of the PBS Masterpiece series.

In 2011, she was named one of Time magazine's "100 Most Influential People in the World".

Early life
Eaton was born in Boston and raised in Pasadena, California, her father a Caltech English literature professor and her mother, Katherine Emery, an actress both on Broadway (in Lillian Hellman's The Children's Hour) and in film. Eaton recalls visiting New York every summer to see Broadway shows as well as spending her junior high school days lost in Jane Eyre.

Education 
Eaton attended Polytechnic School, graduating in 1965, and then Vassar, graduating in 1969 with a BA in English literature. Her senior thesis was on James Joyce's Dubliners. In 1969–70 she was a production assistant for the BBC World Service in London. Returning to the U.S., she was in 1972 hired by WGBH in Boston, there producing Pantechnicon (a radio arts magazine) and the television programs Zoom and Enterprise.

Career 
Eaton became the third executive producer of Masterpiece Theatre. Christopher Sarson was at the helm from its inception in 1971. Sarson had bought Upstairs, Downstairs from ITV. Eaton succeeded the series' second executive producer, Joan Wilson, in 1985.

Under Eaton, Masterpiece extended its reach into feature film co-production for such films as Jane Austen's Persuasion and Mrs. Brown starring Dame Judi Dench.

By 2011, she had been executive producer of the show for more than 25 of its 40 years on the air.

Personal life
In 1984, Eaton married sculptor Paul Robert Cooper. Their daughter was born shortly before Eaton was named executive producer of Masterpiece. She credits her husband's willingness to stay at home with having advanced her career.

Honors
Eaton's honors include 62 Primetime Emmy Awards, 16 Peabody Awards, six Golden Globes, and two Academy Award nominations (for the Masterpiece co-production Mrs. Brown). Queen Elizabeth II has honored her with an honorary OBE (Officer of the Order of the British Empire). In 2011 she was one of Time magazine's "100 Most Influential People in the World".

Television series
Since becoming executive producer of Masterpiece in 1985, Eaton is credited with producing for American audiences series that include:
 Prime Suspect
 Bleak House
 The Lost Prince (WGBH)
 Inspector Morse
 Agatha Christie's Marple
 House of Cards
 Tony Hillerman's Skinwalkers, Coyote Waits, and A Thief of Time
 The Complete Jane Austen
 Cranford (WGBH)
 Wallander
 Little Dorrit
 Sherlock
 Downton Abbey (WGBH)
 Upstairs, Downstairs (remake)
Endeavour

References

External links
 

1947 births
Living people
Television producers from California
American women television producers
Vassar College alumni
Businesspeople from Boston
People from Pasadena, California
Honorary Officers of the Order of the British Empire
21st-century American women
Primetime Emmy Award winners